XC2 or XC-2 may refer to:

 2011 XC2, a near-Earth asteroid
 AIDC XC-2, Taiwanese prototype civil transport aircraft
 Kantega XC2, German single and two-place paragliders
 Kawasaki XC-2, Japanese military transport aircraft
 Summit XC2, German single-place paraglider
 Trango XC2, German single-place paraglider
 Xenoblade Chronicles 2, a 2017 action role-playing game for the Nintendo Switch console